The 1953–54 Syracuse Nationals season was the 5th season for the franchise in the National Basketball Association (NBA). In the Eastern Division Finals, the Nationals swept the Boston Celtics 2-0 to make it to the NBA Finals. The Nationals would go on to lose the Finals in 7 games to the Minneapolis Lakers.

Regular season

Season standings

x – clinched playoff spot

Record vs. opponents

Game log

Playoffs

|- align="center" bgcolor="#ccffcc" 
| 1
| March 17
| @ Boston
| W 96–95 (OT)
| Dolph Schayes (20)
| Dolph Schayes (13)
| Earl Lloyd (8)
| Boston Garden
| 1–0
|- align="center" bgcolor="#ccffcc" 
| 2
| March 18
| New York
| W 75–68
| Dolph Schayes (23)
| Dolph Schayes (16)
| Paul Seymour (6)
| Onondaga War Memorial
| 2–0
|- align="center" bgcolor="#ccffcc" 
| 3
| March 21
| @ New York
| W 103–99
| Dolph Schayes (36)
| Dolph Schayes (21)
| Paul Seymour (6)
| Madison Square Garden III
| 3–0
|- align="center" bgcolor="#ccffcc" 
| 4
| March 22
| Boston
| W 98–85
| Dolph Schayes (25)
| Dolph Schayes (16)
| Paul Seymour (7)
| Onondaga War Memorial
| 4–0
|-

|- align="center" bgcolor="#ccffcc" 
| 1
| March 25
| Boston
| W 109–94
| Dolph Schayes (27)
| Dolph Schayes (21)
| Bill Gabor (6)
| Onondaga War Memorial
| 1–0
|- align="center" bgcolor="#ccffcc" 
| 2
| March 27
| @ Boston
| W 83–76
| Wally Osterkorn (16)
| —
| George King (8)
| Boston Garden
| 2–0
|-

|- align="center" bgcolor="#ffcccc" 
| 1
| March 31
| @ Minneapolis
| L 68–79
| Bob Lavoy (15)
| Wally Osterkorn (8)
| Paul Seymour (6)
| Minneapolis Auditorium4,579
| 0–1
|- align="center" bgcolor="#ccffcc" 
| 2
| April 3
| @ Minneapolis
| W 62–60
| Wally Osterkorn (20)
| Wally Osterkorn (17)
| Lavoy, Seymour (3)
| Minneapolis Auditorium6,277
| 1–1
|- align="center" bgcolor="#ffcccc" 
| 3
| April 4
| Minneapolis
| L 67–81
| Bob Lavoy (18)
| Bob Lavoy (15)
| Paul Seymour (7)
| Onondaga War Memorial8,719
| 1–2
|- align="center" bgcolor="#ccffcc" 
| 4
| April 8
| Minneapolis
| W 80–69
| Paul Seymour (25)
| Bob Lavoy (11)
| Paul Seymour (6)
| Onondaga War Memorial7,655
| 2–2
|- align="center" bgcolor="#ffcccc" 
| 5
| April 10
| Minneapolis
| L 73–84
| Dolph Schayes (17)
| Earl Lloyd (8)
| Wally Osterkorn (5)
| Onondaga War Memorial7,283
| 2–3
|- align="center" bgcolor="#ccffcc" 
| 6
| April 11
| @ Minneapolis
| W 65–63
| Paul Seymour (16)
| —
| —
| Minneapolis Auditorium6,776
| 3–3
|- align="center" bgcolor="#ffcccc" 
| 7
| April 12
| @ Minneapolis
| L 80–87
| Dolph Schayes (18)
| —
| —
| Minneapolis Auditorium7,274
| 3–4
|-

Awards and records
Dolph Schayes, All-NBA First Team
Paul Seymour, All-NBA Second Team

References

Philadelphia 76ers seasons
Syracuse